Jonny Alexander Uchuari Pintado (born 19 January 1994) is an Ecuadorian footballer who plays for Morelia.

Career

LDU Loja
Uchuari is a youth exponent from LDU Loja. He made his debut for LDU Loja in Ecuadorian Serie A at 22 May 2011 in a 1-2 away win against Deportivo Cuenca. He scored his first league goal at 14 August 2011 against Independiente del Valle.

LDU Quito
Uchuari joined Quito side, LDU Quito on December 23, 2014 for One year.

International career
Uchuari was called for Friendlies against United States and El Salvador on October 10 and 14th, 2014 respectively. Uchuari made his debut for Ecuador against El Salvador, coming in as a sub for Jonathan González.

Honours

Copa Libertadores Runner Up (1): 2016

References

External links

1994 births
Living people
Association football wingers
Ecuadorian footballers
Ecuador international footballers
Atlético Morelia players
L.D.U. Quito footballers
L.D.U. Loja footballers
C.S.D. Independiente del Valle footballers
C.D. Cuenca footballers
C.D. El Nacional footballers
C.S.D. Macará footballers
People from Loja, Ecuador